Do Not Fold, Staple, Spindle or Mutilate is a Canadian short drama film, directed by John Howe and released in 1967. Written by American playwright and screenwriter Millard Lampell, the film stars Ed Begley as an established trade union leader fighting an attempt by the union membership to push him out in favour of a new, younger leader with a more modern approach.

The film's cast also includes Harvey Fisher, Bruno Gerussi, Cec Linder, Sean Sullivan and Al Waxman.

Awards
 Canadian Labour International Film Festival, Montreal: Grand Prize, 167 August 15, 1967
 20th Canadian Film Awards, Toronto: Genie Award for Best Film Over 30 Minutes, 1968
 International Labour and Industrial Film, Antwerp: Award of Excellence, 1969
 International Labour and Industrial Film, Antwerp: Diploma of Merit, 1969

References

Works cited

External links

Do Not Fold, Staple, Spindle or Mutilate at the National Film Board of Canada

1967 films
Best Theatrical Short Film Genie and Canadian Screen Award winners
National Film Board of Canada short films
1967 short films
Films directed by John Howe (director)
1960s English-language films
Canadian drama short films
1960s Canadian films